SuperFerry, founded as Aboitiz Shipping Company, later Aboitiz SuperFerry was one of the largest ferry companies in the Philippines before it was purchased by Negros Navigation, which simultaneously was purchased by the Chinese government through its private equity fund the China-Asean Investment Cooperation Fund, and became 2GO Travel, part of the 2GO Group.

The shipping company was known in the 1990s as William, Gothong & Aboitiz (WG&A). Aboitiz bought out the William Lines and Gothong Lines Group . The Gothong Group restarted its own shipping company called Carlos A. Gothong Lines (CAGLI), while the William Group opted to concentrate on its logistics, warehousing, and courier business, called Fast Logistics. SuperFerry and its sister companies SuperCat and Cebu Ferries are owned and operated by the former Negros Navigation when Negros Navigation bought all of Aboitiz Transport System, was sold to China-Asean Investment Cooperation Fund, and relaunched as 2GO Travel in 2012.

Destinations
The following the ports of call were served by SuperFerry:

Luzon
Manila
Batangas City, Batangas

Visayas
Bacolod, Negros Occidental
Caticlan Jetty Port, Malay, Aklan (Gateway to Boracay)
Cebu City, Cebu
Iloilo City, Iloilo
Ormoc City, Leyte
Tagbilaran City, Bohol

Mindanao
Nasipit, Agusan del Norte
Cagayan de Oro
Iligan City, Lanao del Norte
Ozamis City, Misamis Occidental
Surigao City, Surigao del Norte
Zamboanga City
Dapitan

Vessels
This list of vessels include those from sister companies Cebu Ferries and SuperCat, and also those from Negros Navigation as part of its purchase deal. Some of them are still operating as part of the 2GO Travel fleet.

WG&A SuperFerry fleet
 SuperFerry 1 - Former SuperFerry fleet; was acquired and renamed M/V St. Rita de Casia by 2GO Travel and eventually sold to an Indonesian shipping company and was renamed KM Mutiara Persada 1. In 2021 she was sold to local shipbreakers in Indonesia.
 SuperFerry 2 - Former SuperFerry fleet; was acquired and renamed M/V St. Thomas Aquinas by 2GO Travel; collided with M/V Sulpicio Express Siete of the former Sulpicio Lines, August 16, 2013, and sank near Talisay in Cebu Province.
 SuperFerry 3 - Lost due to fire incident; in 2000, while the vessel was undergoing ship repairs in Keppel Cebu Shipyard, hot works on certain parts of the ship started a fire and caused evasive damages, effectively gutting the whole vessel.  WG&A later held the shipyard owners liable for the incident.
 SuperFerry 5 - Acquired by 2GO Travel and renamed M/V St. Joan of Arc; was retired from service and sold to breakers in Alang, India
 SuperFerry 6 -  Former Our Lady of Akita of Gothong Lines, was acquired and renamed SuperFerry 6 after the merge into WG&A. In 2000, an engine fire on its starboard side swept the ship while en route to Manila from General Santos, October 2000; all of the 862 passengers and 168 crew were saved and the fire brought under control, but the ship was a total loss.
 SuperFerry 7 - Former Naminoue Maru of A" Line shipping in Japan, and built in 1980, she was  sold to William Lines in 1994 and renamed the Mabuhay 2; later becoming  a part of the WG&A fleet as part of the  William, Gothong, and Aboitiz Shipping lines merger and was renamed SuperFerry 7. She was eventually lost to an extensive fire incident in 1997, wherein the whole vessel was gutted due to a presumed electrical fire while docked at Pier 4; same incident that would happen to its sister ship SuperFerry  3 later in 2000, but this time, was caused by hot works around the ship. She only spent 3 years sailing under the Philippine flag after the acquisition from Japan.
 SuperFerry 8 - Built in 1977 as M/V Akebono Maru of A” Line shipping by Usuki Iron Works Ltd. in their Saiki, Japan shipyard. Sold in 1989 to William Lines and was renamed into M/V Sugbu. She was renamed into Mabuhay 3 and eventually was refurbished in Singapore. Renamed into SuperFerry 19 in 2004; leased in 2006 by Peninsula, a shipping company in Papua New Guinea; temporarily renamed into Milne Bay and was eventually sold to Jiangmen Xinhui Shipbreaking Co. Ltd; a shipbreaking company in China after it returned from Papua New Guinea.
 SuperFerry 9 - Built in 1986 by Usuki Iron Works Ltd. at Saiki, Japan, and launched as the Ariake, it was then converted in 1995 for William Lines Incorporated and renamed Mabuhay 5. In 1996, the ship was renamed SuperFerry 9 and has been operated by Aboitiz Transport System Corp (ATSC) since that time. It was known to be a problematic ship, with several engine problems causing delays and stranding of passengers. In 2009, due to a presumed rough sea conditions and shifting of cargo containers below decks, it capsized off the southwest coast of Zamboanga Peninsula while en route from General Santos to Iloilo and sank almost 5 hours after the first distress call sent by the captain. All 968 passengers and crew were accounted for. There were 10 fatalities.
After the merge, she became WG&A's flagship and was renamed SuperFerry 10. She was eventually sold to breakers in China in 2002, still in perfectly good working condition, as a casualty of WG&A's liquidation of ships after the merger break-up. She only managed to sail for 9 years in Philippine waters after the William Lines acquisition.
 SuperFerry 11 - Renamed Our Lady of Banneux and transferred to SuperFerry's subsidiary, Cebu Ferries; sold and broken up in 2003
 SuperFerry 12 - Renamed M/V St. Pope John Paul II and was the flagship of 2GO Travel. SuperFerry 12 was the former New Miyako of Hankyu Ferry of Japan and was sold to WG&A in 1999 and renamed Aboitiz SuperFerry 12. She was involved in a collision with the passenger-cargo boat M/V San Nicholas in 2003. It was repaired and was active as a passenger Ro-Ro and cargo vessel under 2GO Travel. She was eventually sold to breakers in Chittagong, Bangladesh in 2021.
 SuperFerry 14 - Built in 1981, she entered service under WG&A in October 2000 and was advertised as a "Festival" ship for her many on-board amenities. On February 27, 2004, at around 12:50 midnight, while the ferry was sailing from Manila bound for Cagayan de Oro, an explosion tore through the vessel, starting a fire that engulfed the ship and caused most of the fatalities. The ferry later sank half-submerged, further hampering rescue and retrieval operation of survivors and missing persons. Upon investigation, a Rajah Sulaiman Movement member confessed to planting a bomb which was triggered by a timing device on board for the Abu Sayyaf group, confirming a terrorist attack. The disaster was  featured in various international news and media due to its magnitude and terrorism nature.  All in all, of the 899 recorded passengers and crew on board, there were 116 fatalities, 53 remained missing and presumed dead. The ship was deemed a total loss by the company.
 SuperFerry 15 (Sold, Became C K Star, now sold to breakers)
 SuperFerry 16 - Sold in 2007 to a Chinese company, renamed New Blue Ocean under Stena Daea Line and eventually was sold in 2016 to 2GO Travel. The vessel was renamed into M/V St. Therese of the Child Jesus and is currently active under 2GO Travel
 SuperFerry 17 (Sold, Became Isabel Del Mar, now sold to breakers)
 SuperFerry 18 (Sold, Became Huadong pearl VI, now sold to breakers)
 SuperFerry 19 - Former SuperFerry 8; is no longer in service and sold to breakers
 SuperFerry 20 - Formerly M/V Sunflower Kogane acquired from Diamond Ferry and was renamed M/V St. Gregory the Great under Negros Navigation, and later under 2GO Travel; ran aground in Iloilo and sold to breakers
 SuperFerry 21 - Formerly M/V Sunflower Nishiki from Kansai Kisen Co., Ltd.; was acquired by Negros Navigation and renamed to M/V St. Leo the Great under 2GO Travel. She was eventually sold to breakers in Chittagong, Bangladesh in 2021.
 M/V Doña Virginia (Former WG&A fleet; retired and sold to breakers)
 M/V Our Lady of Naju (Former WG&A fleet, was eventually sold to breakers in China in 2002)
 M/V Our Lady of Sacred Heart (Former WG&A fleet, retired and sold to breakers)
 M/V Our Lady of Lipa (Former WG&A fleet, retired and sold to breakers in Alang, India)
 M/V Our Lady of Medjugorje (Former SuperFerry fleet, sold to a shipping company in Indonesia)

Negros Navigation fleet
 M/V St. Michael the Archangel - The former flagship of Negros Navigation and was considered the largest among its fleet; was acquired and is currently active under 2GO Travel
 M/V St. Joseph the Worker - Former fleet of Negros Navigation acquired by 2GO Travel; was retired and sold to breakers
 M/V St. Peter the Apostle - Former fleet of Negros Navigation acquired by 2GO Travel; was retired and sold to breakers
 M/V St. Ezekiel Moreno (Retired and sold to breakers)
 M/V St. Francis of Assisi (Caught fire in 1999; later sold to breakers)
 M/V Mary, Queen of Peace (Retired and sold to Indian breakers, 2008)
 M/V San Lorenzo Ruiz (Retired and sold to Indian breakers, 2008)
 M/V San Paolo (Sold to breakers)
 Container Ship San Sebastian (Retired and sold to breakers)
 M/S Santa Florentina (Retired and sold to breakers)
 M/S Santa Maria (Retired and sold to breakers)
 M/S Princess of Panay (Sold to breakers)
 M/S Princess of Negros (Retired and sold to breakers)
 M/V Cebu City (Sank in 1994)
 M/V Misamis Occidental (Retired and sold to breakers)
 M/V Connie I (Retired and sold to breakers)
 M/V Connie II (Retired and sold to breakers)
 M/V Don Julio (Retired and sold to breakers)
 M/V Don Claudio (Retired and sold to breakers)
 M/V Don Juan (Former Negros Navigation fleet; sank in 1980)
 M/V Don Vicente (Retired and sold to breakers)
 M/V Doña Monserrat (Retired and sold to breakers)
 M/V Doña Florentina (Retired and sold to breakers)

Cebu Ferries fleet
 M/V St. Augustine of Hippo - Former Cebu Ferry 1 from Cebu Ferries, was acquired by and is currently active under 2GO Travel
 M/V St. Anthony de Padua - Former Cebu Ferry 2 from Cebu Ferries, was acquired by and is currently active under 2GO Travel
 M/V St. Ignatius of Loyola - Former Cebu Ferry 3 from Cebu Ferries, was acquired by and is currently active under 2GO Travel
 Our Lady of Mount Carmel (Sold to George and Peter Lines and renamed as M/V GP Ferry 2)
 Our Lady of Good Voyage - Former Cebu Ferries fleet; was sold to Gothong Southern and renamed M/V Doña Conchita Sr.; later sold to Trans-Asia Shipping Lines and was renamed Trans-Asia 9
 Our Lady of Lourdes
 Our Lady of Montserrat
 Our Lady of Manaoag
 Our Lady of Fatima
 Our Lady of Guadalupe
 Our Lady of the Rule (Broken up by ship breakers in Alang, India)

SuperCat fleet
 Supercat - I (Sold to Emeraude Lines renamed as NORMANDIE EXPRESS, later renamed as Moorea Express)
 Supercat 1 (Sank while en route to Calapan, Mindoro)
 Supercat 2 (Sold to Korean shipping company KOREA EXPRESS FERRY CO.,Ltd, renamed as Korea Express)
 Supercat 3 (Sold to Croatian shipping company Jadrolinija, renamed as Karolina)
 Supercat 5 (Sold to Croatian shipping company Jadrolinija, renamed as Judita)
 Supercat 6 (Sold to Moreton Bay Whale Watching; sold to Seo Kyung Korea renamed as Gold Coast)
 Supercat 7 (Sold to Croatian shipping company Jadrolinija, renamed as Novalja)
 Supercat 8 (Sold to Croatian shipping company Jadrolinija, renamed as Dubravka)
 Supercat 9 (Sold to Croatian shipping Company, renamed as Bisovo)
 Supercat 10 (Sold to Korean shipping company WONDERFUL ISLAND CO., renamed as Mosulpo 1 (모슬포1호))
 Supercat 11 (Renamed St. Raphael; sold to Italian shipping company Ustica Lines and renamed Federica M)
 Supercat 12 (Renamed St. Gabriel; sold to Italian shipping company Ustica Lines and renamed Gabrielle M)
 Supercat 17 (Sold to Wightlink for use between Portsmouth and Ryde, renamed as FastCat-Ryde)
 Supercat 18 (Sold to Wightlink for use between Portsmouth and Ryde, renamed as FastCat-Shanklin)
 Supercat 20 (Sold to South African shipping company FakoShip, renamed as Endurance)
 Supercat 21 (Returned to her lessor)
 Supercat 23 (Renamed St. Uriel, currently in regular service on Batangas - Calapan route under SuperCat)
 Supercat 2001 (Was also named Tricat 50; sold and renamed SEA POWER 1)
 Supercat 2002 (Sold to a Dutch shipping company, renamed as Tiger)

Incidents and accidents
On October 12, 2000, SuperFerry 6 caught fire on its starboard panel and sank. More than 1,000 passengers were rescued.
On February 27, 2004, SuperFerry 14 was bombed by the Abu Sayyaf terrorists killing 116 people. It was considered as the worst terrorist attack in the Philippines.
On March 9, 2006, SuperFerry 12 caught fire off the coast of Bantayan Island. None of the 664 passengers were injured.
On September 6, 2009, SuperFerry 9 reported engine trouble while on its way to the port of Iloilo from General Santos. The ship then listed to a 30–40 degree angle, and at 2am the captain of the vessel ordered to abandon ship. It later sank off the southern Zamboanga Peninsula with more than 966 people on board. 957 people have been rescued but there are also 9 fatalities.
On August 16, 2013, the cargo ship Sulpicio Express Siete collided with the ferry St. Thomas Aquinas, sinking it in 100 feet deep waters off Talisay City in Cebu province. There were 831 people on board (715 passengers and 116 crewmembers). Initial reports indicated over 600 were rescued, with 31 confirmed dead and 172 missing.

See also
Negros Navigation
Cebu Ferries
Montenegro Lines
Supercat Fast Ferry Corporation (SFFC)
Roble Shipping Inc.
Trans-Asia Shipping Lines
List of shipping companies in the Philippines

References

External links

2GO Group

Ferries of the Philippines
Passenger ships of the Philippines
Shipping companies of the Philippines
Transportation in Cebu
Transportation in Mindanao
Transportation in the Visayas
Companies based in Manila
Defunct transportation companies of the Philippines